The Bay Area Toros was a professional baseball team based in Texas City, Texas, in the United States. The Toros were a member of the Continental Baseball League, which is not affiliated with Major League Baseball. From the 2008 season to 2009, the Toros played their home games at Robinson Stadium. In 2010, the Toros suspended operations, announcing they could return for the 2011 season. The Toros were the first minor league baseball team in the Houston metropolitan area since the 1970s.

Year-by-year record

Notable players
On March 22, 2008, pitcher Brandon Sisk signed with the Kansas City Royals organization.

External links
 Official site

Continental Baseball League teams
Professional baseball teams in Texas
Baseball teams in Houston
Defunct independent baseball league teams
Baseball teams disestablished in 2009
Defunct baseball teams in Texas
Baseball teams established in 2007